Every Little Thing is the debut studio album by American country music artist Carly Pearce. It was released on October 13, 2017.

Reception

Stephen Thomas Erlewine of AllMusic considered the songs in the album "appealing" and that they "feel fresh in their melodies and observations." He thought that in the album "Pearce establishes her own identity: her showbiz and country roots are inextricably entangled, a singer with a feel for the past but an eye for the present".
Matt Bjorke of Roughstock judged that there is depth in the lyrics of the songs in the album, depth in her "powerful vocal", and depth in the production that "allows for Carly to be the artist that she is".

Every Little Thing debuted at No. 4 on the Top Country Albums chart and No. 32 on the Billboard 200, selling 9,700 copies (15,000 equivalent album units including streams and track sales). Carly Pearce also reached No. 1 on the Emerging Artists Chart on the strength of the album release. The album has sold 39,000 copies in the United States as of November 2018.

Singles
The album's lead single, the title track, was released to country radio on February 22, 2017. It became her first Number One hit on the Billboard Country Airplay charts on the week dated November 25, 2017.

The album's second single, "Hide the Wine," was released to country radio on December 4, 2017.

Promotional singles
"If My Name Was Whiskey" was released as the first official promotional single on June 23, 2017.

The second promotional single "Color" became available on Apple Music on September 15, 2017, and became available for all on September 16, 2017.

"I Need a Ride Home" was released as the third promotional single a week later, on September 22, 2017.

The album version of "Dare Ya", which was originally released in May, featuring a slightly different arrangement, was released as the fourth promotional single on September 29, 2017.

The final promotional single, "Hide the Wine", was released on October 6, 2017. Pearce said this is her favorite promotional single that she has released from the album.

Track listing
Track listing adapted from The Boot.

Personnel
Adapted from AllMusic

Paul Barber - programming
busbee - bass guitar, steel guitar, programming, synthesizer
Joeie Canaday - bass guitar
Eric Darken - percussion
Ian Fitchuk - electric guitar, organ, piano, vibraphone
Bobby Hamrick - background vocals
Wes Hightower - background vocals
Mark Hill - bass guitar
Josh Matheny - dobro, steel guitar
Carl Miner - banjo, acoustic guitar, mandolin
Carly Pearce - lead vocals, background vocals
Emily Shackleton - background vocals
Aaron Sterling - drums, percussion
Russell Terrell - background vocals
Ilya Toshinsky - banjo, bouzouki, acoustic guitar, keyboards, mandolin, mellotron, Wurlitzer
Allison Veltz - background vocals
Laura Veltz - background vocals
Derek Wells - electric guitar

Charts

References

 

2017 debut albums
Carly Pearce albums
Big Machine Records albums
Albums produced by busbee